Plugrá is a brand of butter made in the United States by Dairy Farmers of America.  It is made with a higher butterfat content than most American butter (82% butterfat, vs. 80%.) The name "Plugra" is derived from the French plus gras ("more fat").

References

External links
 Plugrá Website
 Plugrá Gourmet Club
 Plugrá on Facebook

Brand name dairy products